The Cooperative Institute for Marine and Atmospheric Studies (CIMAS) is a research institute of the University of Miami located in its Rosenstiel School of Marine and Atmospheric Science (RSMAS) in Miami, Florida. 

CIMAS brings together the University of Miami's RSMAS) and other partner universities with those of the NOAAA to develop a Center of Excellence that is relevant to understanding the Earth's oceans and atmosphere within the context of NOAA's mission. 

In 2010. CIMAS was restructured in light of its successful submission to a competitive award program to keep pace with changes in scientific and societal priorities and changes in both NOAA and the University of Miami's research priorities. CIMAS is one of sixteen NOAA Cooperative Institutes (CIs).

The nine partner universities include:
 Florida Atlantic University (FAU)
 Florida International University (FIU)
 Florida State University (FSU)
 Nova Southeastern University (Nova)
 University of Florida (UF)
 University of Miami (UM)
 University of Puerto Rico at Mayagüez (UPRM)
 University of South Florida (USF) 
 University of Virgin Islands (USVI)

CIMAS research themes include:
 Climate research and impacts
 Tropical Weather
 Sustained Ocean and Coastal Observation
 Ocean Modeling
 Ecosystem Modeling and Forecasting
 Ecosystem Management
 Protection and Restoration of Resources

References

External links
 Official website
 Rosenstiel School of Marine and Atmospheric Science (RSMAS) official website 

Office of Oceanic and Atmospheric Research
Research institutes in Florida
Meteorological research institutes
University of Miami